Gordon is an unincorporated community in Howard County, Maryland, United States.
A postal stop operated at this location from December 21, 1893, to April 15, 1895.

References

Year of establishment missing
Unincorporated communities in Howard County, Maryland
Unincorporated communities in Maryland